The Kottayam–Kumily Road, better known as K K Road is the State Highway connecting Kottayam and Idukki districts of Kerala state, India. It is designated as State Highway 13 (SH 13) by the Kerala Public Works Department. It is the first rubberised road in Kerala.

Route description
This road starts from NH 183 at Kottayam and ends at Kumily. The K K Road passes through

Kottayam
Manarcaud → Pampady  → Ponkunnam  → Kanjirappally  → Mundakayam.

Idukki
Kuttikkanam → Peermade → Vandiperiyar → Kumily.

See also
 Roads in Kerala
 List of State Highways in Kerala

State Highways in Kerala
Roads in Idukki district